Eric Cook (26 July 1909 – 23 August 1986) was a Canadian politician.

Born in St. John's, Newfoundland, he was a lawyer, businessman and a city councillor in St. John's. He was also the president of the Newfoundland Liberal party. He was summoned to the Senate of Canada in 1964 representing the senatorial division of St. John's East, Newfoundland and Labrador. He sat a member of the Liberal caucus until 1982 when he resigned and sat as an Independent.

References

External links
 

1909 births
1986 deaths
Canadian senators from Newfoundland and Labrador
Independent Canadian senators
Liberal Party of Canada senators
St. John's, Newfoundland and Labrador city councillors